Maxim Rasseikin (born 26 April 1998) is a Russian professional ice hockey forward currently playing with Avtomobilist Yekaterinburg of the Kontinental Hockey League (KHL).

He signed as free agent to a one-year contract with Yunost Minsk of the Belarusian Extraleague (BLR) on 10 May 2020. He returned to Avtomobilist in the following off-season, agreeing to a two-year contract on 12 May 2021.

References

External links
 

1998 births
Living people
Avtomobilist Yekaterinburg players
Russian ice hockey centres
Lincoln Stars players
Sportspeople from Yekaterinburg
Yunost Minsk players